Urša Raukar-Gamulin (Zagreb, 18 May 1960) is a Croatian theater, television and film actress, as well as a political activist and parliamentarian. She is a permanent member of the Zagreb Youth Theater ensemble.

Apart from her acting work in Croatia and in international co-productions, she is known to the public as an activist for co-organizing protests and demonstrations against US President George W. Bush, Zagreb Mayor Milan Bandić, nationalism, gentrification, cultural policies and other issues.

Since 2017, she has been active for the local green-left political platform as a coordinator for Zagreb is OURS!. In 2020 she ran in the national elections for the Croatian Parliament on the list of the wider national coalition platform We Can!

She is a grand granddaughter of Ivan Kukuljević Sakcinski first parliamentarian who gave a speech in Croatian language and one of the most prominent people in Illyrian movement. In January 2022 she gave a speech in Croatian parliament about Ankica Lepej as first prominent whistle-blower of modern Croatia.

Filmography

Television roles 

"Stipe u gostima" as Irena/Mirjana (2012–2013)
 "Tajni dnevnik patke Matilde" as sheep Lujza (2010–2014)
 "Baza Djeda Mraza" as nanny Wilhelmina (2009)
 "Bumerang" as financial officier (2005)
 "Žutokljunac" as nanny (2005)
 "Tales of Mystery and Imagination" as Rosie (1991)

Film roles 

"The Clean-Up" (2014)
"Shame on You" (2013)
Once Upon a Winter's Night/Jednom davno u zimskoj noć (2012)
 Lea i Darija – Dječje carstvo as lady in audience (2011)
 Pratioci (2008.)
 I Have to Sleep, My Angel/Moram spavat', anđele as Ana (2007)
 "Zagorka" as friend (2007)
 Libertas as Lucia (2006)
 Sleep Sweet, My Darling/Snivaj, zlato moje as Blanka (2005)
 Sedma kronika (1996)
 Zona sudbine (1992)
 A Summer to Remember/Ljeto za sjećanje (1990)

Voice actor for cartoons 

 "BFG: Blagi Fantastični Gorostas" as queen Elizabeth II (2016)
 The Incredibles/Izbavitelji (2004.)
 "Pobuna na farmi" as Bara (2004)
 Finding Nemo/Potraga za Nemom as Nara (2003)

Published works 
 Raukar, Urša. "Naša Ici." Kazalište XIX, br. 67/68 (2016): 32–33. https://hrcak.srce.hr/184722

References

External links 
 
ZeKaeM theater – Urša Raukar-Gamulin's page (in Croatian)

1960 births
Living people
Actresses from Zagreb
Croatian television actresses
Croatian stage actresses
Croatian film actresses
Politicians from Zagreb
21st-century Croatian women politicians
21st-century Croatian politicians